In enzymology, a phosphatidylinositol-4-phosphate 3-kinase is an enzyme that catalyzes the chemical reaction

ATP + 1-phosphatidyl-1D-myo-inositol 4-phosphate  ADP + 1-phosphatidyl-1D-myo-inositol 3,4-bisphosphate

Thus, the two substrates of this enzyme are ATP and 1-phosphatidyl-1D-myo-inositol 4-phosphate, whereas its two products are ADP and 1-phosphatidyl-1D-myo-inositol 3,4-bisphosphate.

This enzyme belongs to the family of transferases, specifically those transferring phosphorus-containing groups (phosphotransferases) with an alcohol group as acceptor.  The systematic name of this enzyme class is ATP:1-phosphatidyl-1D-myo-inositol-4-phosphate 3-phosphotransferase. Other names in common use include type II phosphoinositide 3-kinase, C2-domain-containing phosphoinositide 3-kinase, and phosphoinositide 3-kinase.  This enzyme participates in phosphatidylinositol signaling system.

Structural studies

References

 

EC 2.7.1
Enzymes of known structure